Henry Lyle Mulholland, 2nd Baron Dunleath (30 January 1854 – 22 March 1931), was an Irish Conservative Member of Parliament.

Early life
Dunleath was the second son of John Mulholland, 1st Baron Dunleath and the former Frances Louisa Lyle (d. 1909). His older brother was the Hon. Andrew Walter Mulholland, who died without issue at age 24 in 1877. His younger siblings included Hon. Alfred John Mulholland (who married Mabel Charlotte Saunderson); Hon. Alice Elizabeth Mulholland (wife of John George Beresford Massy-Beresford and mother to Monica Wichfeld); Hon. Helen Mulholland (wife of Sir George Herbert Murray); and Hon. Louisa Frances Mulholland (wife of Edward Roger Murray Pratt).

His mother was a daughter of Harriet Cromie (a daughter of John Cromie) and Hugh Lyle of Knocktarna in County Londonderry. His father was the eldest son of the former Elizabeth MacDonnell (a daughter of Thomas MacDonnell of Belfast) and Lord Mayor of Belfast Andrew Mulholland of Ballywalter Park. The Mulholland family were prominent in the cotton and linen industry in Ireland.

Career
He served as High Sheriff of Down in 1884. The following year, he was returned to the British House of Commons for Londonderry North, a seat he held until the 1895 general election. Later that year, he succeeded his father in the barony and entered the House of Lords.

Personal life
In 1881, Lord Dunleath was married to Norah Louisa Fanny Ward, the only surviving daughter of Hon. Somerset Richard Hamilton Augustus Ward (fifth son of Edward Ward, 3rd Viscount Bangor), by his wife Norah Mary Elizabeth Hill (only daughter of Lord George Hill, fifth son of Arthur Hill, 2nd Marquess of Downshire). Together, they were the parents of five children, four sons and one daughter, including:

 Hon. Andrew Edward Somerset Mulholland (1882–1914), who married Lady Hester Joan Byng (1888–1976), fifth daughter of the Rev. Francis Byng, 5th Earl of Strafford, in 1913. He was killed in action in the First World War. After his death, his widow remarried to Field Marshal Rudolph Lambart, 10th Earl of Cavan.
 Hon. Eva Norah Helen Mulholland (1884–1972), who married Capt John Vernon Saunderson, a son of Edward James Saunderson, MP.
 Charles Henry George Mulholland, 3rd Baron Dunleath (1886–1956), who married Sylvia Henrietta Brooke, eldest daughter of Sir Arthur Douglas Brooke, 4th Baronet, in 1920. After her death in 1921, he married Henrietta Grace D'Arcy, second daughter of Most Rev. Charles D'Arcy, Archbishop of Armagh and Primate of All Ireland.
 Sir Henry George Hill Mulholland, 1st Baronet (1888–1971), who became Speaker of the House of Commons of Northern Ireland and was created a Baronet in 1945. 
 Hon. Godfrey John Arthur Murray Lyle Mulholland (1892–1948), who married Hon. Olivia Vernon Harcourt, a daughter of Lewis Harcourt, 1st Viscount Harcourt and Mary Harcourt, Viscountess Harcourt. Olivia served as Woman of the Bedchamber to Queen Elizabeth the Queen Mother.

Lord Dunleath died on 22 March 1931, aged 77, and was succeeded in the barony by his second son Charles. Lady Dunleath died in 1935.

Descendants
Through his second son, he was a grandfather of Charles Mulholland, 4th Baron Dunleath (1933–1993).

Sailing 

He inherited the schooner Egeria from his father, and had the Charles E Nicholson designed 4 ton lugger Wolfhound built for him at Camper and Nicholsons, Gosport in 1893.

References
Notes

Sources

External links

External links 
 
 
 Henry Lyle Mulholland, 2nd Baron Dunleath (1854-1931) at the Lafayette Negative Archive

1854 births
1931 deaths
Linen industry in Ireland
Dunleath, Henry Mullholland, 2nd Baron
Irish Conservative Party MPs
High Sheriffs of Down
Members of the Parliament of the United Kingdom for County Londonderry constituencies (1801–1922)
UK MPs 1885–1886
UK MPs 1886–1892
UK MPs 1892–1895
UK MPs who inherited peerages